Anemonastrum is a genus of flowering plants in the buttercup family Ranunculaceae. Plants of the genus are native to the temperate and subarctic regions of North America, Greenland, Europe, Asia, South America, and New Zealand. The generic name Anemonastrum means "somewhat like anemone", a reference to the Anemone genus of closely related plants. It chiefly differs from Anemone in having a base chromosome number of x=7, as opposed to x=8.

Species
, Kew's Plants of the World Online accepts 38 species in the genus Anemonastrum:

Anemonastrum antucense (Poepp.) Mosyakin & de Lange
Anemonastrum baicalense (Turcz.) Mosyakin
Anemonastrum biarmiense (Juz.) Holub
Anemonastrum calvum (Juz.) Holub
Anemonastrum canadense (L.) Mosyakin
Anemonastrum coelestinum (Franch.) Mosyakin
Anemonastrum crinitum (Juz.) Holub
Anemonastrum deltoideum (Douglas) Mosyakin
Anemonastrum demissum (Hook.f. & Thomson) Holub
Anemonastrum dichotomum (L.) Mosyakin
Anemonastrum elongatum (D.Don) Holub
Anemonastrum fasciculatum (L.) Holub
Anemonastrum flaccidum (Fr.Schmidt) Mosyakin
Anemonastrum geum (H.Lév.) Mosyakin
Anemonastrum imbricatum (Maxim.) Holub
Anemonastrum keiskeanum (T.Itô ex Maxim.) Mosyakin
Anemonastrum narcissiflorum (L.) Holub
Anemonastrum obtusilobum (D.Don) Mosyakin
Anemonastrum patulum (C.C.Chang ex W.T.Wang) Mosyakin
Anemonastrum polyanthes (D.Don) Holub
Anemonastrum polycarpum (W.E.Evans) Mosyakin
Anemonastrum prattii (Huth ex Ulbr.) Mosyakin
Anemonastrum protractum (Ulbr.) Holub
Anemonastrum richardsonii (Hook.) Mosyakin
Anemonastrum rockii (Ulbr.) Mosyakin
Anemonastrum rupestre (Wall. ex Hook.f. & Thomson) Mosyakin
Anemonastrum sachalinense (Juz.) Starod.
Anemonastrum shikokianum (Makino) Holub
Anemonastrum sibiricum (L.) Holub
Anemonastrum smithianum (Lauener & Panigrahi) Holub
Anemonastrum subindivisum (W.T.Wang) Mosyakin
Anemonastrum subpinnatum (W.T.Wang) Mosyakin
Anemonastrum tenuicaule (Cheeseman) de Lange & Mosyakin
Anemonastrum tetrasepalum (Royle) Holub
Anemonastrum trullifolium (Hook.f. & Thomson) Mosyakin
Anemonastrum villosissimum (DC.) Holub
Anemonastrum yulongshanicum (W.T.Wang) Mosyakin
Anemonastrum zephyrum (A.Nelson) Holub

References

 
Ranunculaceae genera